= Cerebroplacental ratio =

Tool used in obstetric ultrasound

Cerebroplacental ratio is a tool used in obstetric ultrasound to predict adverse pregnancy outcome. It is measured by dividing the pulsatility index of the middle cerebral artery of the foetus by the pulsatility index of the umbilical artery of the foetus. A cerebroplacental ratio lower than 1-1.1 in uncomplicated pregnancies is indicative of placental insufficiency, independent of the actual fetal size.
